Valerie Collison (born 23 March 1933) is an English organist and composer of hymns and carols.  Her best-known work is "Come and Join the Celebration" for which she composed both the lyrics and tune. This was first published in Carols for Children in 1972 and is now performed in services throughout the UK. She also wrote "The Journey of Life", popular in English primary schools as part of the Come and Praise hymnal. She was born in Bromley and worked as a medical secretary.

References

1933 births
Living people
English Christian hymnwriters
British women hymnwriters
Composers of Christian music
English classical organists
People from Bromley